Matthias Worch (born 1976) is a German video game designer and computer graphics artist. He started out creating custom Doom and Quake levels. Matthias entered the computer game industry in 1998 when he moved to Dallas, Texas to work on Ritual Entertainment's 3D First Person Shooter SiN. He has since contributed to various 3D action games. Matthias has spoken at the Game Developers Conference and the IGDA. Matthias is working at Epic Games as a Design Lead on the special projects group.

List of games
 SiN – PC game (1998)
 Unreal Mission Pack - Return to NaPali – Windows, Mac OS (1999)
 The Wheel of Time – Windows (1999)
 Unreal 2 – Windows (2003)
 Star Wars Rogue Squadron III: Rebel Strike – Nintendo GameCube (2003)
 Lair – PlayStation 3 (2007)
 Dead Space 2 – Windows, Xbox 360, PlayStation 3 (2011)
 Star Wars 1313 - (Cancelled) (2013)
 Mafia III - Windows, Xbox One, PlayStation 4 (2016)
 Unreal Engine
 Fortnite

References

External links
 
 

German video game designers
1976 births
Living people
Place of birth missing (living people)